Charles L. Valentine (October 16, 1846April 13, 1925) was an American government administrator and Republican politician.  He was the 37th mayor of Janesville, Wisconsin, and represented Janesville in the Wisconsin State Assembly during the 1901 and 1903 sessions.

Biography

He was born on October 16, 1846, in Genesee County, New York.  As a child, he moved to Wisconsin with his family in 1849, settling in Janesville, Wisconsin. During the American Civil War, Valentine enlisted in the Union Army and served with the 5th Wisconsin Infantry Regiment. He was severely wounded in the Battle of Spotsylvania Court House, which resulted in the loss of his right foot. Valentine was elected to the Wisconsin State Assembly in 1900 and was re-elected in 1902. Additionally, he was Clerk and Postmaster of Janesville and Register of Deeds of Rock County, Wisconsin. In 1918, Valentine served as mayor of Janesville. He was a Republican. Valentine died in Janesville, Wisconsin after being ill for two years.

References

External links

People from Genesee County, New York
Politicians from Janesville, Wisconsin
Mayors of places in Wisconsin
Republican Party members of the Wisconsin State Assembly
Wisconsin postmasters
People of Wisconsin in the American Civil War
Union Army soldiers
American amputees
1846 births
1925 deaths